Barren County is the fourth studio album by progressive bluegrass band New Grass Revival, released in 1979 on the Flying Fish label. The album is named for Barren County near the musicians' homes in south-central Kentucky in the United States.

Track listing
 "Dancin' With the Angels" (Peter Rowan) – 3:58
 "In the Plan" (Gene Clark, Doug Dillard, Bernie Leadon) – 3:02
 "How About You" (Winchester) – 4:02
 "Crazy in the Night" (Steve Brines, Sam Bush) – 3:33
 "Don't Look Back" (Brines, Bush) – 4:39
 "Spring Peepers" (Lucas) – 3:23
 "Souvenir Bottles" (Brines, Bush, John Cowan) – 5:47
 "Goin' to the Fair" (Brines, Bush) – 5:11
 "Lee Highway Blues" (Traditional) – 5:45

Personnel 
 Sam Bush - mandolin, electric guitar, guitar, fiddle, electric mandolin, lead vocals
 John Cowan - electric bass, lead vocals
 Courtney Johnson - banjo, guitar, vocals
 Curtis Burch - guitar, Dobro, vocals
 Kenny Smith - piano ("How About You")
 Kenny Malone - drums ("How About You", "Crazy in the Night", "Souvenir Bottles"), percussion ("Goin' to the Fair")
 Bill Kenner - mandolin ("Lee Highway Blues")

References

New Grass Revival albums
1979 albums